The Soviet RD-0120 (also designated 11D122) was the Energia core rocket engine, fueled by LH/LOX, roughly equivalent to the Space Shuttle Main Engine (SSME). These were attached to the Energia core rather than the orbiter, so were not recoverable after a flight, but created a more modular design (the Energia core could be used for a variety of missions besides launching the shuttle). The RD-0120 and the SSME have both similarities and differences. The RD-0120 achieved a slightly higher specific impulse and combustion chamber pressure with reduced complexity and cost (but it was single-use), as compared to the SSME. It uses a fuel-rich staged combustion cycle and a single shaft to drive both the fuel and oxidizer turbopumps. Some of the Russian design features, such as the simpler and cheaper channel wall nozzles, were evaluated by Rocketdyne for possible upgrades to the SSME. It achieved combustion stability without the acoustic resonance chambers that the SSME required.

Specifications

RD-0120 
 Thrust (vacuum): 1.8639MN (190tons), (sea-level): 1.5171MN
 Specific impulse (vacuum): , (sea-level): 
 Burn time: nominal 480–500s, certified for 1670s
 Basic engine weight: 3,449 kg
 Length: 4.55m, diameter: 2.42m
 Propellants: LOX & LH
 Mixture ratio: 6:1
 Contractor: Chemical Automatics Design Bureau (Конструкторское Бюро Химавтоматики)
 Vehicle application: Energia core stage.

See also 
 Energia
 RS-25
 RD-170

References

External links 
Molniya Research & Industrial Corporation's Buran page (english)
RD-0120 details (in Russian)
Energiya Booster details (in Russian)

Rocket engines of the Soviet Union
Rocket engines using hydrogen propellant
Soviet inventions
Rocket engines using the staged combustion cycle
KBKhA rocket engines